Rajakumaran may refer to:

 Rajakumaran  (film), a Tamil film starring Prabhu
 Rajakumaran (director), Tamil film director